Chavoshan (also Romanized as Chāvoshān) is a village in Mahidasht Rural District, Mahidasht District, Kermanshah County, Kermanshah Province, Iran. At the 2006 census, its population was 80, in 21 families.

References 

Populated places in Kermanshah County